PRRD can stand for:

 Peace River Regional District, a regional government in British Columbia, Canada
 Powell River Regional District, a regional government in British Columbia, Canada
 President Rodrigo Roa Duterte, Filipino lawyer, politician, and former President of the Philippines